The Fuzhou Transliteration Scheme refers to the romanization scheme published in 1994 for the Fuzhou Dialect Dictionary, romanizing the Fuzhou dialect. It does not explicitly state the tones.

Initials

As the Fuzhou dialect has two initial consonants that arise only after initial assimilation of other initials in certain phonological environments, there are two extra letters outside the standard initial tables.

Finals

As the Fuzhou dialect exhibits the phenomenon of rime tensing with certain finals, the tense rime is presented first, with its lax equivalent after. Certain tense-lax distinctions present in the dialect are not transcribed in this transliteration scheme; others however are explicitly rendered.

See also
 Fuzhou dialect
 Guangdong Romanization

Fuzhou
Romanization of Chinese